The Panama slender opossum (Marmosops invictus), also known as the slaty slender mouse opossum, is a species of opossum in the family Didelphidae. It is endemic to Panama, where it has been found in tropical rainforest habitats, including disturbed areas, at elevations from 500 to 1500 m. This opossum is mostly terrestrial in its habits, and feeds on plants and insects. It is vulnerable to deforestation.

References

Opossums
Marsupials of Central America
Mammals described in 1912
Taxonomy articles created by Polbot